Genzheaul (Genjeavul; , Genƶ-Evl) is a rural locality (a selo) in Bayramaulsky Selsoviet, Khasavyurtovsky District, Republic of Dagestan, Russia. The population was 779 as of 2010. There are 9 streets.

Geography 
Genzheaul is located 22 km northeast of Khasavyurt (the district's administrative centre) by road. Bayramaul is the nearest rural locality.

References 

Rural localities in Khasavyurtovsky District